Al-Mujaydil ( (also: al-Mujeidil) was an Arab-Palestinian village located 6 km southwest of Nazareth. Al-Mujaydil was one of a few towns that achieved local council status by the Mandatory Palestine government. In 1945, the village had a population of 1,900 and total land area of 18,836 dunams – mostly Arab-owned. The population was  partly Christian and the town contained a Roman Catholic church and monastery.

After the 1948 depopulation of Palestine, it was destroyed and overbuilt by Migdal HaEmek.

History
Traces of a Roman road was found close to the village, which may indicate that the region was opened to intensive settlements as early as Roman times.

Ottoman era
In the 1596 tax records, Al-Mujaydil  was part of the Ottoman Empire, nahiyah (subdistrict) of Tabariyya under the Sanjak Safad, with a population of 4 Muslim families. The villagers paid a fixed tax rate of 25% on various agricultural products, including wheat and barley, fruit trees, as well as on goats and beehives; a total of 3,295 akçe. Half of the revenue went to a Waqf.  In 1799 it was named Magidel in the map of Pierre Jacotin.

C.R. Conder, of the PEF's Survey of Western Palestine, camped by the place in the 1870s, and described the village as a place being visited by missionaries. The village was also described as being "flourishing", and built of stone and mud. It was on the northern side of a small plateau, and olive groves were cultivated to the south and to the east. The population size was estimated at 800 (in 1859), and they cultivated 100 faddans.

In 1882, Grand Duke Sergei Alexandrovich of Russia, the brother of the Russian Tsar, visited the village, and donated money for the construction of a Russian Orthodox Church there in the hope that local Christians would be converted to the Orthodox faith. However, the Patriarch of Jerusalem Nikodim opened the church to all denominations in the village and ensured it functioned most of the time as a village school.

A population list from about 1887 showed that  el Mujeidel had about  1,000 inhabitants; "for the greater part Muslims".

In 1903, a Roman Catholic church was built in the village. It housed on its first floor a trilingual school for boys and girls, (teaching was in Arabic, Italian and French). It also housed a local clinic for the benefit of the villagers.

British Mandate era

According to the British Mandate's   1922 census of Palestine, Mujaidel had 1,009 inhabitants; 817 Muslims and 192 Christians,  where 150 of the Christians were  Orthodox, 33 Roman Catholics,  2 were Melkite and 7 were Anglicans.

In 1930, the al-Huda mosque was built in the village, it was 12 meters high and 8 meters wide. A kuttab was nearby. The mosque was famous for the elaborate system it used to collect rainfall from its roof into a well. A tall minaret was added in the 1940s.

By the  1931 census the population had increased to 1,241;   1,044 Muslims and 197 Christians, in a total of  293 houses.

In the 1945 statistics the population of Mujeidil was 1,900; 1,640 Muslims and  260 Christians,  with a total  of  18,836  dunams of land, according to an official land and population survey.  Of this, 1,719 dunams of land were for plantations and irrigable land,  15,474 for cereals, while 34 dunams were built-up land.

1948 and aftermath
Al-Mujaydil was occupied and captured by the Haganah's Golani Brigade during second half of Operation Dekel on  15 July 1948. The attack included a bombing raid by Israeli planes. Most of the population fled to the nearby city of Nazareth, where they live as  internal refugees.

In August 1948, a  Jezreel Battalion Golani patrol encountered "groups of Arab women working fields" near  Al-Mujaydil, and they reported that: "I [squad OC Shalom Lipman] ordered the machine-gun to fire three bursts over their heads, to drive them off. They fled in the direction of the olive grove...". But after the patrol left, the villagers returned. The patrol came back and encountered "a group of Arab men and women... I opened fire and killed a Palestinian man and one man and one woman were injured. In the two incidents, I expended 31 bullets." The following day, 6 August, the same patrol encountered two Arab funeral processions. The commander remarked dryly that "one can only assume that one of yesterday ´s wounded died."  A day or two after, the patrol again encountered "a large group of Arab women in the fields of Mujeidil. When we approached them to drive them off, an Arab male [was found] hiding near them, [and] he was executed by us. The women were warned not to return to this area of Mujeidil." The company commander's commented: "Arab women repeatedly attempt to return to Mujeidil, and they are usually accompanied by men. I gave firm orders to stymie every attempt [lehasel kol nisayon] to return to the village of Mujeidil."

However, in 1950, after intervention from the Pope Pius XII, the Palestinian Christians of the village were offered the opportunity to move back to the village, but refused to do so without their Muslim neighbours. Israel then destroyed half of the houses and one of the village mosques.

The Israeli town of Migdal HaEmek  was founded by Iranian Jews in 1952 on the Palestinian destroyed village land, less than 1 km southwest of the village site.  Yifat, established in 1926 on what were traditionally village land, is 2 km to the west of the site of Al-Mujaydil.

The Palestinian historian  Walid Khalidi, described the remains of the village in 1992: "Most of the site is covered with a pine forest that serves as an Israeli park. The monastery and parts of the ( destroyed) church are the only remaining buildings on the site; monks still live in the monastery. Remnants of destroyed houses and the walls of a cemetery are visible. Cactuses and pomegranate, olive, and fig trees grow around the site, which is dotted with wells."

Notable descendents
Diana Buttu.

References

Bibliography

External links
 Welcome to al-Mujaydil
al-Mujaydal, Zochrot
Survey of Western Palestine, Map 5:  IAA, Wikimedia commons 
Al-Mujaydil from the Khalil Sakakini Cultural Center
Al-Mjeidel from Dr. Moslih Kanaaneh
Untold stories: Mohammed Buttu,  IMEU, 20 February 2008
Nimr Khatib: Death Among the Olive Groves, WREMEA, May–June 2008
Israel bars Palestinian grandmother from visiting slain father's grave for 70 years,  Sheren Khalel on November 16, 2017

Arab villages depopulated during the 1948 Arab–Israeli War
District of Nazareth